Krassin Valchev Himmirsky (born on 8 October 1938 in Varbitza, Vratsa Province, Bulgaria) is a Bulgarian poet and former career diplomat.

Diplomatic career
Graduated from the Moscow State Institute of International Relations in International Relations with Indonesian language (1962). Received a PhD degree in American Literature after defending a thesis on “The Development of the Democratic Traditions in Contemporary American Poetry” in the Academy of Social Sciences in Moscow (1974).

As a career diplomat Himmirsky has been assigned at the Bulgarian Embassies in:
 Jakarta, Indonesia - as chargé d'affaires a.i., cultural and press attache (1964-1968),
 Washington DC, United States - as chargé d'affaires a.i. and cultural attache (1976-1981), and
 Moscow, USSR - as minister plenipotentiary (1987-1990).

Recently he has been employed as a Democratization officer and an Election officer of the Organization for Security and Cooperation in Europe (OSCE) Mission to Bosnia and Herzegovina (1999-2002). Later he was head of the Science department of the Russian Cultural and Information Centre in Sofia.

Poetry
Krassin Himmirsky has taught Literature, American Studies, Asian Civilizations, Religions and Culture at: Sofia University "St. Kliment. Ohridski", the University of National and World Economy, the New Bulgarian University, Shumen University "Konstantin Preslavski" and the American University in Bulgaria. He is the only Bulgarian lecturer of Indonesian language.

Among his publications are books of poetry and fiction:
 “Time Bomb” (1999),
 “Martians” (1996),
 “Looking for Atlantis” (1987),
 “Star Bread”, (1987),
 “Open Up, Sir” (1986),
 “I Believe” (1980),
 “Cambodia”, etc.

His works are translated into the major European and Asian languages. He has read his works at poetry readings in Sofia, Moscow, Kyiv, Chișinău, Washington DC, New London, Jakarta, Bandung, Struga, etc. His poetic works have been recorded and are included into the Collection of the Library of the Congress in Washington DC.

Himmirsky has translated into Bulgarian creative writings by American, Canadian, Russian, Armenian, Lithuanian, Latvian, Moldovian, Chuvash and Indonesian authors. Among the authors, he has translated, are: Carl Sandburg, Erskine Caldwell, John Chever, John Updike, Robert Frost, Robert Lowell, William Meredith, Robert Hayden, Denise Levertov, Wendell Berry, Allen Ginsburgh, Roland Flint, Victoria Holt, Pramoedia Ananta Toer, Michail Sespel, Yurii Sahakyan, Oleg Hlebnikov, Valerii Shamshurin, Raisa Sarbi, Porfirii Afanasiev, Utui Tatang Sontani, Anthology of Indonesian poetry, etc.

Member of the unions of Bulgarian writers, translators, journalists, member of the International Slavic Fund (Moscow), member of the Board of Bulgarian-Indonesian Friendship Association “Nusantara”. Krassin Himmirsky is president of the MGIMO Allumni Association, Bulgaria.

Notes

External links
 Persona Grata. Красин Химирски (МО 62) - an interview in alumni-mgimo.ru (in Russian)

Bulgarian diplomats
20th-century Bulgarian poets
Bulgarian male poets
People from Vratsa Province
Bulgarian translators
Academic staff of Sofia University
Moscow State Institute of International Relations alumni
1938 births
Living people
20th-century male writers